Charles Hale (1831–1882) was an American legislator and diplomat.

Charles Hale may also refer to:
Charles A. Hale (1930–2008), American historian
Charles R. Hale (bishop) (1837–1900), American Anglican bishop
Charles R. Hale (anthropologist) (born 1957), scholar and academic

See also
Charlie Hales (born 1956), American politician